G38 may refer to:

 HMAS Nizam (G38), a Royal Australian Navy destroyer
 SMS G38, the Imperial German Navy torpedo boat
 Junkers G.38, a German transport aircraft of the 1930s
 Glock 38, a firearm
 Bi-pin, G38 a type of bi-pin lamp base